Staatsspoorwegen (Dutch for State Railways, full name: Dienst der Staatsspoor- en Tramwegen in Nederlandsch–Indië (State Railways and Tramways Service in the Netherlands Indies, SS en T), commonly abbreviated as SS) was a railway company owned by the Dutch East Indies colonial government. The company was one of the companies that were transferred to the present Kereta Api Indonesia after Indonesian independence in 1945.

Staatsspoorwegen operated railways in three narrow gauge rails: 1.067 mm (3 ft 6 in), 750 mm (2 ft 5 1⁄2 in) and 600 mm (1 ft 11 5⁄8 in). The 1,067 mm tracks are for heavy railway lines, while the 750 and 600 mm are only used for tramway lines.

History 
According to the Verslag der Handelingen van Staten-Generaal (Report of the Proceedings of the States General), there are proposals for the connection of two Nederlandsch-Indische Spoorweg Maatschappij (NIS) railway lines which are extended to Surabaya and continued to Pasuruan, and the route from Depok to the eastern region of Bogor Regency (Buitenzorg) which is said to be fertile. The proposal was made by Mr. P.P. van Bosse before the States General in November 1873 at the same time evaluating two NIS railway lines, namely Batavia-Buitenzorg and Samarang-Vorstenlanden (operating since 21 May 1873).

However, NIS has experienced a deficit in capital injection since the operation of the two railway lines that were built. In fact, the company has repeatedly been threatened with bankruptcy.

Although Java was said to be the most advanced island in the Dutch East Indies, access to transportation at that time was still limited because it still used the road mode which was only supported by carts, horse-drawn carriages, and canoes to cross the river. The cost of transportation by these modes is very expensive because agricultural and plantation products sold to big cities are not sold well, because they are no longer hygienic while transportation takes a long time.

In the end, with the enactment of Staatsblad (official gazette) No. 141, at the request of the successors of P.P. van Bosse (Fransen van der Putte and Baron van Goldstein), the colonial government officially intervened to build the railway line and a company was formed which was later known as Staatsspoorwegen Nederlandsch-Indië (Netherlands Indies State Railways). This company was founded on 6 April 1875 based on the enactment.

See also 
 History of rail transport in Indonesia

References

Defunct railway companies of Indonesia
Dutch East Indies
Companies established in 1875
1875 establishments in the Dutch East Indies
Companies disestablished in 1942